"Phenomenon" is the first single by American rapper LL Cool J from his seventh studio album of the same name. It samples the Creative Source cover of "Who Is He (And What Is He to You)?" by Bill Withers and interpolates bits of Liquid Liquid's song "Cavern". The lyrics "Something Like a Phenomenon" and the beat are taken from the song "White Lines (Don't Don't Do It)" by Melle Mel. "Phenomenon" was released on September 23, 1997. The single peaked at number 55 on the US Billboard Hot 100, reached number nine on the UK Singles Chart, and charted within the top 20 in the Netherlands and New Zealand.

Track listings

US 12-inch single
A1. "Phenomenon" (radio edit)
A2. "Phenomenon" (LP version)
A3. "Phenomenon" (instrumental)
B1. "Hot Hot Hot" (radio edit) 
B2. "Hot Hot Hot" (LP version)
B3. "Hot Hot Hot" (instrumental)

UK and European CD single
 "Phenomenon" (radio edit) – 3:06
 "Wanna Get Paid" (featuring the Lost Boyz) – 4:10
 "Mama Said Knock You Out" – 4:48
 "Phenomenon" (LP version) – 4:12

Australasian CD single
 "Phenomenon" (radio edit) – 3:06
 "Phenomenon" (LP version) – 4:12
 "Phenomenon" (instrumental) – 4:12
 "Phenomenon" (TV) – 4:03

Charts

Weekly charts

Year-end charts

References

1997 singles
Def Jam Recordings singles
LL Cool J songs
Music videos directed by Paul Hunter (director)
Songs written by Bill Withers
Songs written by LL Cool J
Songs written by Sean Combs